Memorial Park or Memorial Community Park is a community park in Colorado Springs, Colorado. It has a wide range of sports facilities, including an indoor and outdoor pool, a recreation center, trails and Prospect Lake.

Colorado and the Rocky Mountain region's largest balloon festival has been held on Labor Day weekend at Memorial Park since 1977.

History
General William Jackson Palmer donated land with Prospect Lake to establish the park, along with other Colorado Springs parks, such as Monument Valley Park, North Cheyenne Cañon, Palmer Park, Pioneer Square (South) Park, and Bear Creek Cañon Park. He donated a total of 1,270 acres of land.

Park facilities
Memorial Park, located at 1605 E. Pikes Peak Avenue, has 3 baseball and softball fields, basketball court, boating, exercise course, fishing, football field, horseshoe pits, in-line hockey court, mountain biking, playground, 15 football and soccer fields, swimming pool, 12 tennis courts, bicycle racing track, roller skate racing track and volleyball court facilities. There is public ice skating and skating lessons at the Mark "Pa" Sertich Ice Center. There is a 1.25 fitness trail, a 2.2 mile perimeter trail, and a .6 mile criterium trail within the park. Around the park are two 5K trails. It also has picnic tables and a picnic shelter. The park is handicapped / ADA accessible, including a wheelchair accessible fishing dock and an ADA accessible playground. The park sits on 196 acres. It is best accessed from South Union Boulevard.

There are vending machines, public telephones, restrooms and concession stands at the park.

Prospect Lake
Swimming, boating and fishing can be enjoyed at Prospect Lake. A bathhouse is located near the beach for swimming. There are two fishing areas and one wheelchair accessible fishing dock.

Both non-motorized and motorized boats may operate on the lake. Sail boats, canoes, row boats and paddle boats may be rented at the park.

There is a 1.25 mile fitness trail at Prospect Lake.

Memorial Park Recreation Center
The YMCA operates the city-owned Memorial Park Recreation Center. It is included in a YMCA membership and is open to the public. Facilities include workout equipment and lap swims during pool hours.  Brunch breaks are held the second Wednesday of each month from 10 to noon for members and patrons.

Aquatics Center
The Memorial Park Recreation Center's 25-yard indoor pool offers free swim and swim lessons year-around, except holidays. There are locker rooms, showers, and a hot tub. YMCA conducts CPR and lifeguard classes there. It is available for after-hours rentals.

Healthy Living Center
The Healthy Living Center has free weights, elliptical machines, treadmills, weight machines, recumbent bikes, medicine balls and bands for physical fitness training. It is open to people 14 years of age and older.

Silver Sneakers group exercise
Classes for seniors include aqua fitness classes and a Muscular Strength and Range of Movement class.

Mind, Exercise, Nutrition, Do It!
The Mind, Exercise, Nutrition, Do It! (MEND) 10-week program for 7- to 13-year-old children starts in June.

Outdoor swimming pool
The swimming pool is open 7 days a week in the summer, starting the day after Memorial Day. It is located at 280 South Union. In a large grassy area nearby are picnic tables.

Pavilions
Three pavilions, that accommodates 50 people each, are located in the southwest section of the park, near Costilla Street and Hancock Avenue. Tennis courts, basketball courts, there is one playground at the pavilion site and three additional playgrounds, and play fields are near the pavilion or in the park. Prospect Lake is encircled by a jogging trail. Amenities include access to a grill at each pavilion and restrooms are available during the summer with reservations. There is no electricity.

Events
Events at the park include:
 May: Free Tennis Play Day
 June: Springs Spree, Springs Spree 5K and 1K Family Fun Run, Pikes Peak Celtic Festival
 August: Rocky Mountain Rampage International Skateboarding Competition, USA Triathlon Youth Splash & Dash
 September: Colorado Balloon Classic

References

External links
 Memorial Park map

Parks in Colorado Springs, Colorado